Judith Wambura Mbibo (born 15 June 1979), known by her stage name Lady Jaydee also referred to as "Lady JayDee in town" or "Lady Jay Dee", is a Tanzanian singer. She specializes in the R&B, Zouk and Afro Pop genres. Lady Jaydee was voted Best Tanzanian Female R&B Artist in 2002, performed at the Kora All Africa Designers Competition, and was awarded "Best R&B Album" at the Tanzania Music Awards on 6 August 2004. In July 2005, she won an award for "best female video for South Africa". She was among the first females to sing R&B in Swahili. Lady Jaydee is signed to one of Africa's most successful music labels, Taurus Musik. She is also known as the Queen of Bongo Flava (Tanzanian Music).

Early life and education
Lady Jay Dee was born in Shinyanga Tanzania in a family of ten children. Her late  father is Lameck Mbibo and her mother is Martha Mbibo. She completed her primary school education at Bugoyi Primary School in Shinyanga and her secondary education at Zanaki Secondary School. In 2017, Lady Jaydee signed a recording deal with Taurus Musik which is also label for Alicios Theluji.

Brand associations
In 2009 she signed up with Zain Tanzania (now known as Airtel Tanzania) to be their ambassador. 
In 2010 she was appointed by Comprehensive Community Based Rehabilitation In Tanzania (CCBRT) to be their Ambassador to help women who suffering from Fistular disease.
In 2012 she was an ambassador of NMB (National Microfinance Bank) Tanzania for the project which was known as "PESA FASTA". 
In March 2014 she signed up with international cosmetics brand Oriflame Sweden to be one of their brand ambassadors.
In 2014 she was appointed by Marie Stopes Tanzania to be the Ambassador of Family Planning Tanzania.
In June 2015 she signed up with Tanzania Geita Gold Mine to be the Ambassador of Geita Gold Mine Kill Challenge Fund Against HIV/AIDS.

Discography 
She has released seven studio albums:
 Machozi (2000)
 Binti (2003)
 Moto (2005)
 Shukrani (2007)
 Ya 5. The Best of Lady Jaydee (2012)
 Nothing But The Truth (2013)
 Woman (2017)
 20 (2021)

Coke Studio Africa 
 In 2013 Lady Jaydee featured in Coke Studio Africa season One where she performed her hit songs " Joto Hasira" and " Yahaya". She also collaborated with Salif Keita, the African music legend from Mali, and worked closely with Coke Studio Africa Music Director, Franck Biyong.

Awards and nominations

References

External links

 
 
 
 

 1979 births
 Living people
 Tanzanian women rappers
 People from Shinyanga Region
 21st-century Tanzanian women singers
 Swahili-language singers
 Tanzanian musicians
 Tanzanian Bongo Flava musicians